The Polaris Award is the highest decoration associated with civil aviation, awarded by the International Federation of Air Line Pilots' Associations (IFALPA) to airline crews in recognition for acts of exceptional airmanship, heroic action or a combination of these two attributes. In extraordinary cases, passengers may also obtain this award for their heroism. These awards are not made every year, but are presented at IFALPA's annual conference.

Past awards

See also

 List of aviation awards

References

Aviation awards